is a passenger railway station located in the village of Hidaka, Takaoka District, Kōchi Prefecture, Japan. It is named after nearby Omura Shrine. It is operated by JR Shikoku and has the station number "K08-1".

Lines

Layout
The station consists of a side platform serving a single track. There is no station building, only a weather shelter on the platform for waiting passengers. A ramp from the access road leads up to the platform. A bike shed and parking lots are provided at the base of the ramp.

Adjacent stations

History
The station was opened by JR Shikoku on 15 March 2008 as a new station on the existing Dosan Line.

Surrounding area
Omura Shrine - a Shinto shrine which holds an ancient gilt bronze sword (or tachi) which is designated as a National Treasure and two wooden masks from the Heian period designated as Important Cultural Properties of Japan.
National Route 33 - runs parallel to the track.

See also
 List of railway stations in Japan

References

External links
 JR Shikoku timetable

Railway stations in Kōchi Prefecture
Railway stations in Japan opened in 2008
Hidaka, Kōchi